3 Stories About Evil is a 2008 short, experimental narrative film directed by Michael Frost and photographed by Andrew K. Sachs. It was written by Walter Reuben and stars Mink Stole, Erica Gavin, Joe Dallesandro, and Billy Drago. It premiered at Boston Underground Film Festival on 21 March 2008. The film is a narrative short composed almost entirely of still photographs. The three stories are interrelated black comedies about family, sexuality, the media, and beauty pageants.

Plot
Three interrelated stories comprise the plot structure of this film. In the first, "The Story of Johnnie & Laurie," Johnnie (Barry Brisco) is betrayed by his sister (Suzette Belouin) when she finds out his sexual proclivities. When she informs her parents (Billy Drago & Erica Gavin) about his homosexuality, their estrangement leads Johnnie through a series of unsavory incidents. In "The Story of Pat & Pepper," Pat (Mink Stole) is a Christian conservative and her five-year-old daughter Pepper (Pepper Peeters) participates in children's beauty pageants. Ambivalent over her daughter's attractiveness to a pageant judge (Daylyn Presley), Pat accidentally kills Pepper and transforms her into a dead chanteuse. Finally, in "The Story of Jim," Jim (Joey Krebs) takes the advice of his best friend Eddie (Laurence Tolhurst) and gets a job in the television industry. When Jim's career plummets due to poor ratings, he finds a sex change operation the perfect solution out of a desperate situation.

Cast

Awards
 Boston Underground Film Festival 2008 - Most Effectively Offensive 
 DragonCon Independent Film Festival (Atlanta, GA) 2008 - Best Dark Comedy 
 RADAR International Film Festival (Hamburg, Germany) 2008 - Best Art & Animation 
 Downtown Film Festival Los Angeles 2008 - Best Experimental Short Film

References

External links 
 
 

2008 films
2000s English-language films